The Estadio de Mongomo is a multi-sports stadium in Mongomo, Equatorial Guinea.

In November 2014, it was announced the stadium will be a venue for the 2015 Africa Cup of Nations.

References 

Football venues in Equatorial Guinea
Mongomo
2015 Africa Cup of Nations